Bryce Marion (born February 13, 1996) is an American soccer player.

Career

Youth and college
Marion played four years of college soccer at Stanford University between 2014 and 2017. While with the Cardinal, Marion made 55 appearances, scoring one goal and tallying nine assists.

Marion also played for Premier Development League side San Francisco City in 2016 and 2017.

Professional
In May 2018, Marion joined United Soccer League side Rio Grande Valley FC Toros. Marion made his professional debut on May 9, 2018, appearing as a stoppage-time substitute in a 2–2 draw with Fresno FC.

References

External links
 
 Bryce Marion at Stanford Cardinal

1996 births
Living people
American soccer players
Association football midfielders
People from Cypress, Texas
Rio Grande Valley FC Toros players
San Francisco City FC players
Soccer players from Texas
Sportspeople from Harris County, Texas
Stanford Cardinal men's soccer players
USL Championship players
USL League Two players